William Larned defeated Beals Wright in the all comers' final, 6–2, 6–8, 6–4, 6–4 to win the men's singles tennis title at the 1901 U.S. National Championships. Three-time reigning champion Malcolm Whitman did not defend his title. The event was held at the Newport Casino in Newport, R.I., USA.

Draw

Challenge round

Finals

Earlier rounds

Section 1

Section 2

Section 3

Section 4

References

 

Men's Singles
1901